Harry Enfield & Chums (originally titled Harry Enfield's Television Programme) is a British sketch show starring Harry Enfield, Paul Whitehouse and Kathy Burke. It first broadcast on BBC2 in 1990 in the 9 pm slot on Thursday nights, which became the traditional time for alternative comedy on television.

Enfield was already an established name due to his 'Loadsamoney' character (which featured in a few entertainment programmes in the late 1980s), but the series gave greater presence to his frequent collaborators Whitehouse and Burke – so much so that, in 1994, the show was retitled Harry Enfield & Chums. In 2001, a clip show series titled Harry Enfield Presents aired which featured compilations of sketches from the series featuring new linking material recorded by Enfield in character.

History
Harry Enfield's Television Programme was written by Enfield, Whitehouse, Charlie Higson and Geoffrey Perkins and broadcast on BBC2. The original series titles began with Enfield in a black suit walking towards the camera and blowing a raspberry to the music of a brass band and ended with him taking a quick drag from a cigarette hidden behind his back. The show ran for two series with this title in late 1990 and spring 1992. A Christmas special entitled Harry Enfield's Festive Television Programme was broadcast on Christmas Eve 1992.

A special, Smashie & Nicey: End of an Era aired at Easter 1994, which retired the characters.

After the original series, there were a couple of radio appearances. During the period between series, Enfield concentrated on straight acting parts, and Whitehouse worked on other projects.

Through repeats, the characters proved popular, and in 1994, the BBC commissioned a new series called Harry Enfield & Chums, this time broadcast on BBC1. This series was produced with a pool of writers, rather than the cast alone. The format of the opening credits was the same, although Enfield was now joined by co-stars Whitehouse and Burke to take a collective bow to the audience. Two Christmas specials of Harry Enfield & Chums were produced for 1997 and 1998. These were titled Harry Enfield & Christmas Chums and Harry Enfield's Yule Log Chums respectively.

For Christmas 1999, and in advance of the forthcoming Kevin & Perry Go Large film, a clip show episode called Harry Enfield Presents Kevin's Guide to Being a Teenager was broadcast. The clip show format was revisited in 2001 with a series of six further Harry Enfield Presents episodes based around individual characters or premises. The episodes in the series were:

Tim Nice-but-Dim's Guide to Being a Bloody Nice Bloke
Wayne and Waynetta's Guide to Wedded Bliss
Guide to Family Values
Look, Listen and Take Heed
The North of England
Guide To Being a Senior Citizen

Episodes

In addition to the main series, the following Christmas and one-off specials were broadcast:

Harry Enfield's Festive Television Programme was broadcast 24 December 1992.

Smashie & Nicey: End of an Era was broadcast 4 April 1994.

Harry Enfield & Christmas Chums was broadcast 24 December 1997.

Harry Enfield's Yule Log Chums was broadcast 28 December 1998.

Harry Enfield Presents Kevin's Guide to Being a Teenager was broadcast 27 December 1999.

Recurring characters and sketches

Harry Enfield's Television Programme Series 1
The following characters and recurring sketches appear for the first time in series 1 of Harry Enfield's Television Programme. In series 1, they are often introduced with title cards announcing the name of the character or sketch.

The Boressszzzzz
Two middle-aged men prone to having achingly dull conversations at parties, revolving mostly around cars ("What are we driving at the moment?"), and laughing loudly at their own jokes.

Doctor Doolittle, He Talks to the Animals
Enfield swears at animals as Doctor Doolittle.

The Double-take Brothers
Two brothers with an irritating propensity for double takes whenever the unexpected occurs.

Fat Bloke
A fat, jolly-looking man (played by David Barber) who made his first appearance in a script for "Lee and Lance". He later formed a running gag where, for no apparent reason, he would walk into the middle of a sketch, hand something to a character (usually appropriate to the situation), be told "Thank you, Fat Bloke!", and walk off.  In the first series of Harry Enfield & Chums, he would be introduced at the end of the closing credits by Enfield who would announce: "The show's not over until the Fat Bloke sings!" whereupon he would sing a song (ranging from "Lord of the Dance" to "Smack My Bitch Up") in operatic style.

Freddie & Jack
Only featured in series 1 of Harry Enfield's Television Programme, Jack, a generic Conservative Party politician and Freddie, a generic Labour Party politician, are portrayed as acting like typical infant school children who frequently squabble over the benefits of their various policies in the manner of a playground-style argument. One particular sketch featured a guest appearance by David Steel, a prominent Liberal Democrat MP at the time, against whom Freddie and Jack unite during a birthday party. This sketch has become more dated than most due to Freddie's frequent references to the EEC.

George Integrity Whitebread
George is a stereotypical, insensitive, plain-speaking Yorkshireman; unfortunately, he usually finds himself in a position of responsibility requiring creativity and sensitivity. When he is first introduced, it is stated with approval by the other characters in the sketch that "Integrity is his middle name", only for them to discover that this is only true in a literal sense.

Lee and Lance
Two idiots who work variously as mechanics, builders, and fruit and veg/fish stall holders, commenting on current affairs much in the same mode as "Pete and Dud". Lance is completely stupid, Lee thinks he is smarter than Lance, and he is, but not by much. One sketch reveals that Lance is tone deaf in English but can sing Italian opera perfectly.

Little Brother (Television Programme) / Kevin the Teenager (And Chums)

One of the most memorable of Enfield's comic creations. In Harry Enfield's Television Programme, Kevin is a pre-teen hyperactive annoying little brother. In the first episode of Harry Enfield and Chums, Kevin Patterson goes through a major personality change on the stroke of midnight as he turns thirteen years old. As Kevin the Teenager he wears baggy/grungy clothing, has longer hair (his fringe obscuring his face) and always appears lethargic. He ruins his parents' lives with his refusal to do anything and complains constantly. He usually brings round his friend Perry, who persistently helps himself to food from the fridge. Perry is faultlessly polite to Kevin's parents, Mr and Mrs Patterson, but in one episode we see he is just as rude to his own parents as Kevin is to his, whereas Kevin is faultlessly polite to them. The character was showcased in a special one-off episode that mixed old and new sketches. The character was so well received that a feature film, Kevin and Perry Go Large, was released in 2000.

Mr Cholmondley-Warner
A snobbish, upper-crust 1930s newsreel presenter (played by Jon Glover). Miles Cholmondley-Warner, with his manservant Greyson (Enfield), would expound on various issues of the day and attempt to uphold the British Empire's values. In the second series this gave way to a series of public information films that would advise, amongst other things, that women refrain from driving and participating in complex conversations (as this would lead to insanity) or that babies be given gin to ensure a good night's sleep. The characters also appeared in a series of TV adverts for Mercury Communications. The sketch Women: Know Your Limits! was plagiarised by a Danish PR agency in a campaign video for the 2009 Danish Act of Succession referendum. Some other sketches within the show also use the 1930s newsreel format but are not connected to any specific character. In keeping with the setting, the brief piece of music that introduced these segments was "Calling All Workers" by Eric Coates, a piece that had previously been used as the theme to Music While You Work, a wartime and post-war BBC radio show.

The Old Gits
An obnoxious pair of old men who take great delight in persecuting younger people, although they do branch out by being cruel to other groups of people, so as not to discriminate. However, in the case of one of their more famous sketches, Alf Git finds his childhood sweetheart Ivy, showing that he once had a kinder side. In Harry Enfield's Television Programme, Enfield played Fred Git and Whitehouse played Alf Git until their names got swapped over in Harry Enfield & Chums to avoid confusion with the Fast Show character Unlucky Alf, who Whitehouse also plays.

The Palace of Righteous Justice
A superhero team who are forced to encounter everyday problems such as opening a bank account. Their members are "Law Man" (Wielder of the mighty sword of Dobber), "Fire Man" (Whose fiery balls of fire can start fires) (played by Nathaniel Parker), "(Kometh the) Ice Man" and (Apparently the most powerful of all) "She Woman Cat Type Thing" - who has the superpower of regurgitating fur balls - celebrated by the others as "her amazing regurgitative powers".

Sergei and Vincent
Vincent from Amsterdam and Segei from Russia visit London.

The Scousers

Played by Harry Enfield, Joe McGann (Mark Moraghan in Harry Enfield & Chums) and Gary Bleasdale, Ga', Ba' and Te' (short forms of the names Gary/Gareth, Barry and Terry) are stereotypical Liverpudlians who alternately fall out and make peace. They often say such things as "Dey do dough, don't dey dough" (They do though, don't they though), and "Alright! Alright! Calm down, calm down", which is what one of them says when the other two start arguing.

The Slobs (Wayne and Waynetta)
A benefit-dependent, lower-class couple with a lack of personal hygiene who spend most of their time smoking cigarettes or eating pizzas. Wayne and Waynetta argue constantly over everything, including the name of their child, whom they eventually name Frogmella because "it's exotic". Later, another daughter is named Spudulika after Waynetta's favourite fast-food franchise Spudulike. A third child, which Waynetta calls Canoe (supposedly named after actor Keanu Reeves), was born of an affair Wayne had with Naomi Campbell which resulted in octuplets. Canoe completes the family with the "brown baby" Waynetta always wanted (since all the other mothers on the estate had one). The couple win the lottery and also win a holiday; but the aircraft crashes because they are so overweight, and they end up stranded in the jungle. The Slobs were derived both from one of Burke's stand-up skits and a couple with a similar lifestyle who lived in the flat below Enfield in his younger days.

Smashie and Nicey

Out-of-date Fab FM DJs Dave Nice and Mike Smash, a thinly veiled parody of some older Radio 1 DJs of the time. It is believed that the characters were based primarily on Mike Read, Simon Bates and Tony Blackburn, though other then-current DJs such as Alan Freeman were also believed to have influenced the writers. Each skit would feature the pair's love of "You Ain't Seen Nothing Yet" by Bachman–Turner Overdrive, seemingly the only record they ever played, although they were shown playing other records at the introduction of several sketches. The pair would also try to outdo each other with deliberate mentions of "charidee" (charity) work for which the pair would ostensibly claim to be keeping "hush-hush". The sketch was dropped when the show became Harry Enfield & Chums, although the characters returned in other programmes, including the hour-long special "End of an Era", a "career" retrospective inspired by the upheavals at Radio 1 in 1993 under new controller Matthew Bannister. The two, particularly Smashie, briefly appeared in a series of TV commercials for Fab ice-cream lollies.

Tim Nice-but-Dim Esq.
An upper-class twit who is usually being ripped off by one of his "jolly nice" chums from his prep or public school days. He is an exaggerated version of "posh" yet pleasant and stupid people that Enfield knew. He is a fictional Old Ardinian (an alumnus of Ardingly College) with an eccentric public school-influenced dress sense involving jeans and a blazer worn over a striped rugby shirt. The character was initially created by Ian Hislop and Nick Newman, who are both Old Ardinians. They wrote the character as an antidote to contemporary portrayals of ex-public schoolboys as sharp-minded, high-achieving young men, and instead chose to base the character on former school contemporaries who had "plenty of money and good manners" but were "light of intellect". Tim's catchphrase is "What an absolutely, thoroughly, bloody nice bloke!" A notable scene was him going to a school reunion at the wrong school.

The character appeared in TV adverts promoting British meat in the late 1990s and early 2000s. The adverts were pulled because of the 2001 foot-and-mouth crisis. The character returned as Tim Nice-But-Balding in the third series of Harry & Paul, episode four, in a Dragon's Den parody sketch. He represents a city banker and it is revealed that Adam Jarvis is his brother. Tim has many things in common with Prince Charles and was briefly engaged to a woman with a similar personality who has a strong resemblance to Diana Windsor. However, neither character was meant to be a direct parody.

"You Don't Want to Do It Like That"
An infuriating know-it-all father who advised various people with both household tasks and diverse jobs, such as a football pundit. This was Enfield's take on the traditional "mother-in-law" stereotype. His catchphrase, on encountering someone, or entering a room is "Only me!" When his interfering goes wrong, he tends to blame everyone but himself, using the catchphrase "Now I do not believe you wanted to do that, did you?"

Harry Enfield's Television Programme Series 2
The following characters and recurring sketches appear for the first time in series 2 of Harry Enfield's Television Programme.

Leslie Norris
A chronically absent-minded pub landlord who is easily confused, never manages to serve a drink and frequently mixes up his anecdotes, customer orders, money ("Now, you gave me a tenner"), the names of even his regular customers (one of whom was played regularly by Martin Clunes) and even his own marital status (Les: "Maureen! Can you come and help me at the bar please, my love?" Regular: "You're not married, Les"). The character is often mistaken for Tim Nice-But-Dim due to their similarities. The pub set looks remarkably similar to the pub in Men Behaving Badly, in which the landlord was also called Les.

Harry Enfield & Chums Series 1
The following characters and recurring sketches appear for the first time in series 1 of Harry Enfield & Chums.

Dr Philip Boyish Good Looks
A blond softly spoken TV doctor. He is often seen on a morning show couch, reading letters from "menopausal women" about their fantasies of him. He seems to take an unusually large number of showers per day.

The Lovely Wobbly Randy Old Ladies
A deliberate contrast, on Enfield's part, to show the opposite of 'The Old Gits': Two lecherous old ladies who do not care who approaches them so long as the newcomer is male and good looking. Their catchphrase is "Ooh! Young man!", which they repeat in an attempt to pass themselves off as "nice little old ladies", while comparing young men they encounter to male celebrities of their young adulthood ("You're the spitting image of a young Lester Piggott"). They also intentionally misinterpret comments made to them as being sexual and flirtatiously tell the victim off for saying it. As the series progresses, they begin creating elaborate plans to get men, which often involve abduction.

Michael Paine
Michael Paine is a self-confessed "nosy neighbour". Played by Whitehouse in the style of Michael Caine as parodied by Peter Sellers in his famous appearance on Parkinson in the early 1970s. The parody is in part based on Caine's character from The Italian Job, a film released in 1969 and much loved by British audiences ("I told you, you're only supposed to blow the bloody doors off!") and his diction when presenting his lines in many of his films. It relies on Caine's ability to impart trivial information in the same way, starting with "Did you know..." and ending with ".. and not a lot of people know that.". Whitehouse continues in this tradition, talking about extremely mundane things his neighbours were doing such as "do you know, he didn't call that woman back until... approximately two hours later.  Would Damon Hill have taken that long to call his mother? I'll be honest with you. I don't know. Not a lot of people know I don't know that, but I don't." All of his anecdotes involve other people on the street, and his information is gained from eavesdropping and spying on them.

The Self-Righteous Brothers
Frank and George Doberman are a pair of opinionated, middle-aged men who spend their time in the pub discussing celebrities they admire. Most are only referred by their surnames, or outrageous alternative names. They describe a kind gesture they would make to the celebrity if they ever met, but then get distracted by an implausible, hypothetical situation and become irate by their own story. George's temper never reaches the same level as Frank's, but as the series progresses, George becomes increasingly strained by Frank's behaviour. Another recurring joke is that both men believe Frank's son may be gay, but they avoid discussing it because Frank has not yet come to terms with it.

In their most famous sketch, Frank actually meets a celebrity in the form of British Formula One driver Damon Hill. Enfield's character initially asks for an autograph, but as their conversation develops, Enfield begins to get angry at Hill whilst describing a hypothetical situation of Hill driving through "the estate" at 200 mph, ending in the inevitable, "OI! HILL! NOO!"

The character was based on a neighbour in a block of flats that Enfield lived in at the time who would insist on deliberately addressing him by his surname. The Self-Righteous Brothers are named after musical duo The Righteous Brothers. In 1998 the Dobermans featured in an advert for Hula Hoops Big O's snacks. In October 2014, Enfield and Whitehouse returned to the characters of Frank and George in a sketch for Channel 4's "The Feeling Nuts Comedy Night".

Stan and Pam Herbert
An affluent couple who spoke with exaggerated Black Country accents and were forever informing people that "We are considerably richer than yow!"  Many sketches involved the couple patronising another couple of similar age, desperate to convince the other couple (Pam's sister and her husband in a couple of sketches) that their greater wealth meant greater happiness or social importance, and their inability to accept the successes or talents of others as being noteworthy (such as the British couple they meet on a Spanish holiday who, fluent in Spanish, are dismissed as "showing off"). Unfortunately, Stan's determination to show off his wealth is matched by his fury when he comes across someone "considerably" richer than him, such as when they try to boast while on holiday to a scruffily dressed man who turns out to own the hotel they are staying in, or when their in-laws win the lottery and become multi-millionaires.

Harry Enfield & Chums Series 2
The following characters and recurring sketches appear for the first time in series 2 of Harry Enfield & Chums.

Arguing Couple 
A married couple (played by Enfield and Julia St John) who quite clearly have grown to despise each other, stuck in a seemingly endless argument which consists of them constantly flinging insults at each other (often to others irritation), yet will not separate or get a divorce for the sake of their son David.

Big Bob Joylove 
Based on the TV series Lovejoy. A shady-looking man who in each sketch faces a problem or disappointment and attempts to bribe someone who has no control of the situation, including paying a station guard to confirm his missed train had not arrived yet, and a nurse to confirm his newborn daughter is a boy. His catchphrases were "Oh, I getcha!" and "You drive a hard bargain, don't you?", always followed by Bob offering more money to his harassed victim.

The Dutch Coppers 
Two gay Dutch policemen who speak directly to the camera in a parody of police documentaries. They are more interested in smoking marijuana, flirting and making gay innuendo than doing any police work. A parody of liberal attitudes in the Netherlands.

Jockeys 
Enfield plays a jockey whose horse effortlessly outruns another played by Ewen Bremner, much to Bremner's annoyance. Enfield also constantly makes inane conversation whilst running alongside him.

Julio Geordio 
Whitehouse portrays a Colombian footballer who has recently joined Newcastle United and speaks in a mixture of Spanish and Geordie. He is always interviewed by the same pundit (Enfield as a parody of John Motson in his iconic sheepskin jacket). As the series progresses, Julio develops more of a Geordie accent as he describes events on and off the field, the latter often involving "liaisons" with pin-up girls of the time such as The Spice Girls and Dani Behr. When the pundit becomes aware that Julio is telling an inappropriate story, he tries in vain to get him back on track. Julio is probably inspired by the arrival of Faustino Asprilla at Newcastle United in 1995 when South American players joining English clubs was rare.

Jürgen the German 
A young German tourist in England who cannot stop apologising for his country's actions "during ze Var". He usually starts off friendly and inquisitive. But when there is a silence in the conversation, he begins apologising for his country, becoming increasingly aggressive in the process. When he is particularly frustrated, he displays Nazi-like tendencies. He also has an unusual quirk where he becomes disorientated if he encounters something about Britain that is not as good as in Germany. For example, he is at a complete loss when a bus is a minute late and another commuter indicates this is normal.

Harry and Lulu the Toddlers 
A toddler and his baby sister played by Enfield and Burke on oversized sets. Harry deliberately hurts Lulu, or more often tricks her into hurting herself, but then plays the innocent when their mother arrives to investigate, and asks for a "big hug", but their mother does not accept his apologies. On Channel 4's Sunday Night Project on 8 February 2009, Harry admitted the characters were based on a young Lily Allen and Alfie Allen (as adults, a singer and actor respectively); at the time of their being toddlers, he was dating their mother, producer Alison Owen.

Mister Dead the Talking Corpse 
Parody of the US TV sitcom Mister Ed, with the talking horse replaced by a talking corpse in a casket, played by Whitehouse.

Modern Dad 
An old-fashioned father, looking and sounding suspiciously like Enfield's own, who struggles to accept his son's homosexuality. While he does make a genuine effort, he often makes tactless remarks and Freudian slips ("Make yourself at homo... er, at HOME!") and judgements based on stereotypes. For example, going up to a pink Fiat Panda that he assumed was his son's car or offering to order Babycham at the local pub. As the series progresses, the son becomes increasingly frustrated by his father's behaviour around his boyfriend. The boyfriend's name is initially "Dominic" but changes to "Shaun", though this was only revealed for the purposes of a joke acknowledging that the role had been recast. Shaun is played by Ewen Bremner in several episodes.

Tory Boy 

A repulsive thirteen-year-old with glaringly out-of-date ideas about the world, based on a cross between a snobbish, unpopular boy who went to school with Enfield, and a younger version of William Hague. Enfield also claimed to have mixed more recent Conservative politicians such as Michael Howard and Michael Portillo together in the character, on the allegation that they were "Tory Boys who have never grown up." Became "Tony Boy" (a parody of Tony Blair) after the 1997 General Election.

Other sketches

William Ulsterman and "Gerry"
A one-off sketch where Harry parodies both ex-Democratic Unionist Party (DUP) leader Rev Ian Paisley and Sinn Féin president Gerry Adams at a house party. William is loud-mouthed and becomes increasingly rude and insulting towards the host (Brigit Forsyth)when she is unable to provide him with his desired canapé of cheese-and-pineapple-on-a-stick. When he has finished his rant, the host awkwardly turns away approaches an unnamed guest who is very clearly supposed to be Adams.  While this second guest is smiley and charismatic, his gestures indicate his anecdote has a violent double-meaning. Enfield has since explained that the sketch was loosely based on an abandoned idea called "The Gerry Adams Family", claiming that no one else wanted to do it in case it caused offence.

Appearances in commercials
Daim did a number of adverts featuring Harry Enfield's Television Programme characters.

Mr Cholmondley-Warner did adverts for Mercury Communications.

Smashie and Nicey appeared in an advert for Nestlés Fab Ice Lolly.

Kevin the Teenager appeared in an advert for Pillsbury Toaster Pockets.

The Self-Righteous Brothers appeared in a series of 1996 British Hula Hoops advertisements that explained that if a consumer found a square Hula Hoop in a packet, he or she would win a prize, with Frank stubbornly and aggressively maintaining that "Hula Hoops are round, they'll stay round, and they'll be around forever!". Frank alone then did some adverts for madasafish.com.

Tim Nice-But-Dim appeared in two adverts for British meat in 2000 (lamb and beef).

Home Media releases and availability

VHS
"Harry Enfield's Television Programme: The Very Best of Series One"
"Harry Enfield's Television Programme: Series Two - Part One"
"Harry Enfield's Television Programme: Series Two - Part Two"
"Harry Enfield & Chums" (Contains some of the best sketches from Series 1)
"Harry Enfield & Chums 1997" (Contains some of the best sketches from Series 2. This video was released in advance of the series airing on BBC One.)
"The New Harry Enfield and Chums Video - Oi No!" (Contains an extended version Harry Enfield and Christmas Chums 1997 Special with previously unseen sketches)
"More Harry Enfield and Chums" (Contains Harry Enfield's Yule Log Chums 1998 Christmas Special)
"Harry Enfield Presents Kevin's Guide to Being a Teenager (Christmas special from 1999, later included on Kevin & Perry Go Large DVD.)

Cancelled DVD Releases
Harry Enfield and Chums: The Complete Collection was due to be released as a two-disc DVD on 21 May 2007, but it was delayed until further notice. It was then to be released on 19 November 2012, but was delayed once again to 11 March 2013, it has since been cancelled.

Harry Enfield: The Collection was going to be a 5-disc set containing both series of Harry Enfield's Television Programme, Harry Enfield's Festive Television Programme, both series of Harry Enfield & Chums, Harry Enfield & Christmas Chums and Harry Enfield's Yule Log Chums.

Streaming
Harry Enfield And Chums (series 1 & 2 and the 1997 & 1998 Christmas Specials) and Harry Enfield Presents have been made available on Netflix and Britbox.

It has now been removed from Netflix and BritBox UK.

Harry Enfield's Television Programme (series 1 & 2) is currently available on Netflix UK.

Legacy
In 2000, Enfield and Burke starred in a feature film based around the Kevin the Teenager character titled Kevin & Perry Go Large.

Enfield and Whitehouse reunited for sketch shows Harry Enfield's Brand Spanking New Show in 2000 and Ruddy Hell! It's Harry & Paul in 2007, the latter of which ran for four series, with a completely new range of characters.

References

External links 
 Harry Enfield & Chums
 

1990 British television series debuts
1998 British television series endings
1990s British satirical television series
1990s British television sketch shows
BBC satirical television shows
BBC television sketch shows
English-language television shows
Television Programme
Television series by Banijay
Television series by Hat Trick Productions
Television series by Tiger Aspect Productions